St. Charles Borromeo Church is a Roman Catholic parish of the Latin Rite. It serves the Barnard neighborhood of Greece, New York in Monroe County. It is on the corner of Dewey Avenue and Maiden Lane. It was founded in 1925 by Bishop Hickey on the request of Leo Lawson and George Pearson, and it included 72 families at its founding, and the first parish Mass was Sunday, November 6, 1925 . From 1926 until 2008, the Parish supported a parochial school

Pastors
Rev. John M. Sellinger (1925-1929)
Rev. William A. Doran (1929-1939)
Rev. Msg. Robert E. Keleher (1939-1968)
Rev. John L. Hedges (1968-1978)
Rev. Emmett J. Halloran (1978-1988)
Rev. Robert Collins, Administrator (1985-1986)
Rev. Terrance Fleming (1988-1992)
Rev. Edward Palumbos (1992-2001)
Rev. Timothy Brown (2001-2008)
Rev. John Firpo (2008- Incumbent)

Current Clergy and Religious Laity
Father John Firpo, Pastor (2008–Present) Former Parochial Vicar (1992-1996)
Fr. Pius Pathmarajah, Parochial Vicar (2015–Present)
Father Thomas Statt, Weekend Assistant (2000–Present)
Deacon Dan Callan, Deacon (2012–Present)

References

Roman Catholic churches in New York (state)